The Sen. James A. Harrison House is a historic house in Nogales, Arizona. It was built in 1915 for Senator James A. Harrison, and designed in the American Craftsman architectural style. It has been listed on the National Register of Historic Places since August 29, 1985.

Its Arizona State Historic Property Inventory report asserted it is the "Best preserved two-story Bungalow in Nogales."

References

 
National Register of Historic Places in Santa Cruz County, Arizona
Houses completed in 1915
1915 establishments in Arizona